Yu Qian (1398–1457), courtesy name Tingyi, art name Jie'an, was a Chinese official who served under the Ming dynasty.

Biography
Yu Qian was born in Qiantang County, Hangzhou, Zhejiang. He started his career in the Ming civil service after obtaining the position of a jinshi (進士; successful candidate) in the imperial examination in 1421. He helped to suppress a rebellion by the prince Zhu Gaoxu in 1426 and earned the favour of the Xuande Emperor (r. 1425–1435), who appointed him as the Grand coordinator of Shanxi and Henan. During the reign of the Zhengtong Emperor (r. 1435–1449), he offended the influential court eunuch Wang Zhen and ended up being imprisoned. However, he was released later, reinstated as an official, and further promoted to serve as the Minister of War.

In 1449, Yu Qian played an important role in leading the Defense of Beijing from attacks by the Oirat Mongols, who had earlier captured the Zhengtong Emperor at the Battle of Tumu. The Jingtai Emperor (r. 1449–1457), who succeeded the Zhengtong Emperor, appointed Yu Qian as the Crown Prince's Guardian and Tutor. In 1457, the former Zhengtong Emperor, who had returned after he was released by the Mongols, seized power from the Jingtai Emperor in a coup and restored himself to the throne as the Tianshun Emperor (r. 1457–1464). Yu Qian was falsely accused of treason and executed. He was later posthumously rehabilitated by the Chenghua Emperor (r. 1464–1487) and given the posthumous name Sumin (lit. "Stern and Suffering") by the Hongzhi Emperor, afterwards changed into "Zhongsu" (lit."loyal and stern") by the Wanli Emperor (r. 1572–1620). There are memorial halls and shrines built in Beijing and Hangzhou to commemorate and honour Yu Qian.

Gallery

See also
 History of Beijing

References

 Zhang, Tingyu et al. History of Ming, Volume 170.

1398 births
1457 deaths
Ming dynasty politicians
Politicians from Hangzhou
Executed Ming dynasty people
People executed by the Ming dynasty by decapitation
Executed people from Zhejiang
Burials in Hangzhou
Deified Chinese people